Piotr Gurzęda (born 23 February 1987 in Giżycko) is a Polish football defender, who currently plays for Finnish club Oulun Palloseura.

He made his debut in the Russian First Division for FC Shinnik Yaroslavl on April 4, 2011 in a game against FC Khimki.

On August 18, 2012 Gurzęda joined Oulun Palloseura in the Finnish second tier Ykkönen.

References

1987 births
Living people
Polish footballers
Polish expatriate footballers
Expatriate footballers in Russia
Polish expatriate sportspeople in Russia
Expatriate footballers in Finland
FC Shinnik Yaroslavl players
Oulun Palloseura players
People from Giżycko
Sportspeople from Warmian-Masurian Voivodeship
Association football defenders